The Hong Kong Baptist Theological Seminary is a Baptist theological institute located in Hong Kong, China. It is affiliated with the Baptist Convention of Hong Kong.

History

The school was founded in 1951 by the Baptist Convention of Hong Kong on the premises of Kowloon City Baptist Church.  In 1958, it inaugurated a new campus.  In 1999, it moved to its current building.

Programs
The school offers programs in evangelical theology, whose
licentiate, master and doctorate.

References

External links

Official site

Baptist seminaries and theological colleges
Baptist Christianity in Hong Kong